Goulding is a census-designated place (CDP) in Escambia County, Florida, United States. The population was 4,102 at the 2010 census. It is part of the Pensacola–Ferry Pass–Brent Metropolitan Statistical Area.

Geography
Goulding is located at  (30.437142, -87.230581).

Demographics

As of the census of 2000, there were 4,484 people, 1,298 households, and 624 families residing in the CDP. The racial makeup of the CDP was 25.00% White, 72.46% African American, 0.36% Native American, 0.60% Asian, 0.02% Pacific Islander, 0.45% from other races, and 1.12% from two or more races. Hispanic or Latino of any race were 1.54% of the population.

There were 1,298 households, out of which 15.4% had children under the age of 18 living with them, 19.0% were married couples living together, 23.3% had a female householder with no husband present, and 51.9% were non-families. 47.1% of all households were made up of individuals, and 27.5% had someone living alone who was 65 years of age or older.  The average household size was 2.15 and the average family size was 3.20.

In the CDP, the population was spread out, with 14.3% under the age of 18, 12.3% from 18 to 24, 34.4% from 25 to 44, 18.8% from 45 to 64, and 20.1% who were 65 years of age or older.  The median age was 39 years. For every 100 females, there were 137.9 males.  For every 100 females age 18 and over, there were 141.6 males.

The median income for a household in the CDP was $14,750, and the median income for a family was $22,969. Males had a median income of $18,606 versus $17,500 for females. The per capita income for the CDP was $8,876.  About 25.0% of families and 30.4% of the population were below the poverty line, including 39.1% of those under age 18 and 30.7% of those age 65 or over.

See also
Brownsville-Brent-Goulding, Florida, a single census area recorded during the 1950 Census

References

Pensacola metropolitan area
Census-designated places in Escambia County, Florida
Census-designated places in Florida